KOLS may refer to:

 Nogales International Airport (ICAO code KOLS)
 KOLS-LP, a low-power radio station (98.5 FM) licensed to serve Oakhurst, California, United States